The Bert Ogden Arena is an indoor arena in Edinburg, Texas, United States. The arena officially opened in August 2018 and currently houses the Rio Grande Valley Vipers of the NBA G League, replacing their former home of Payne Arena. The arena seats nearly 7,700, which can be expanded up to a maximum capacity of 9,000 for concerts.

Location and design
The arena was mainly built for basketball, but also hosts concerts and other events.

Additional arena features:
 A 40 x 20 foot LED video scoreboard – the largest in South Texas 
 Wi-Fi  
 Wrap-around LED Ribbon Board
 Concourse TVs

History
The arena held its first event on August 31, 2018, featuring Latin music artist Luis Miguel.

Additional opening events featured WWE Live, J Balvin, Romeo Santos, George Lopez and Marc Anthony.

References

External links
 Official Site

Basketball venues in Texas
Edinburg, Texas
Indoor arenas in Texas
NBA G League venues
Sports venues in the Rio Grande Valley
Rio Grande Valley Vipers
Buildings and structures in Edinburg, Texas
Buildings and structures in Hidalgo County, Texas